Niels Holst-Sørensen (born 19 December 1922) is a Danish former athlete and air force officer and centenarian. He served as the commander-in-chief of the Royal Danish Air Force in 1970–1982 and Denmark's military representative to NATO in 1982–1986. He won gold and silver medals at the 1946 European Athletics Championships and served as a member of the International Olympic Committee from 1977 to 2002.

Athletic career

Holst-Sørensen's first major international meeting was the 1946 European Championships, which took place in Oslo. Holst-Sørensen won the gold medal in the 400 metres with a time of 47.9 seconds. He won a silver medal over 800 metres, finishing a tenth of a second behind the Swedish athlete Rune Gustafsson in a time of 1:51.1. He was also a member of the Danish team which finished fourth in the 4 x 400 metres relay in a time of 3:15.4.

Holst-Sørensen competed in the 800 metres at the 1948 Olympics in London. He qualified for the final as no. three in a semifinal in a time of 1:52.4, and finished the final in ninth place in a time of 1:54.0.

Holst-Sørensen won a total of ten Danish championships over 400 and 800 metres, winning both events every year from 1943 to 1947. In 1943 in Stockholm he won the 800 metres in an international match against Sweden in a time of 1:48.9, the fastest time recorded in the world that year. A few days later, coming home to Denmark, he was arrested. As a lieutenant of the Danish army he was interned for a period, because the Danish government had finally broken with the German occupation authorities, while Holst-Sørensen was competing in Stockholm. Holst-Sørensen began his career running for Herning GF, but switched to Københavns Idræts Forening in 1944.

Holst-Sørensen joined to International Olympic committee in 1977 and served as a member until 2002. He served on the IOC's coordination committees for the Winter Olympic Games in Albertville in 1992, Lillehammer in 1994, Nagano in 1998 and Salt Lake City in 2002. He was named as an honorary member of the IOC following his retirement in 2002. Holst-Sørensen also served as the president of the National Olympic Committee from 1981 to 1984.

Military career

Holst-Sørensen is a graduate of the Royal Danish Army Officers Academy and was a serving Lieutenant in the Royal Danish Army during his athletic career. He was transferred to the Royal Danish Air Force at its foundation in 1950. He eventually rose to the rank of Major General and served as the commander-in-chief of the Air Force from 1970 to 1982 and Denmark's military representative to NATO from 1982 to 1986. He retired from the Air Force in 1987.

References

External links
 

1922 births
Living people
People from Herning Municipality
Danish male sprinters
Danish male middle-distance runners
Olympic athletes of Denmark
Athletes (track and field) at the 1948 Summer Olympics
International Olympic Committee members
Danish generals
European Athletics Championships medalists
Sportspeople from the Central Denmark Region